La Benâte is a former commune in the Charente-Maritime department in the Nouvelle-Aquitaine region in southwestern France. On 1 January 2016, it was merged into the new commune Essouvert.

Population

See also
Communes of the Charente-Maritime department

References

Former communes of Charente-Maritime
Populated places disestablished in 2016